The 2001 UNCAF Nations Cup was played in Honduras.

Participating teams

Squads

Venues

First round

Group 1

Group 2

Final round

Champions

Guatemala, Costa Rica and El Salvador qualified automatically for 2002 CONCACAF Gold Cup. Panama enters a playoff for qualification against Cuba.

Goalscorers
6 goals

 Jorge Dely Valdés

3 goals

 Rolando Fonseca
 Freddy García
 Milton Núñez
 Carlos Pavón
 Julio Dely Valdés

2 goals

 Dion Frazer
 Walter Centeno
 Jorge Rodríguez
 Mario Acevedo
 Dwight Pezzarossi
 Jairo Martínez
 Alfredo Anderson

1 goal

 Mark Leslie
 Rónald Gómez
 Luis Marín
 Andrés Núñez
 Héctor Canjura
 Rudis Corrales
 Josué Galdámez
 Fredy González
 Francisco Ramírez
 Deris Umanzor
 Denis Chen
 Walter Estrada
 Iván Guerrero
 Jaime Rosales
 Danilo Turcios
 José María Bermúdez
 Víctor Webster
 Juan Carlos Cubillas

1 own goal

 David Solórzano

References

 
2001 in Central American football

2001
2001
2000–01 in Salvadoran football
2000–01 in Costa Rican football
2000–01 in Honduran football
2000–01 in Belizean football
2000–01 in Guatemalan football
2000–01 in Nicaraguan football
2000–01 in Panamanian football